The 2013 AFC Cup Final was the final of the 2013 AFC Cup, the 10th edition of the AFC Cup, a football competition organized by the Asian Football Confederation (AFC) for clubs from "developing countries" in Asia.

The final was contested as a single match between two Kuwaiti teams, Al-Qadsia and Al-Kuwait. The match was hosted by Al-Qadsia at the Al-Sadaqua Walsalam Stadium in Kuwait City on 2 November 2013.

Defending champions Al-Kuwait defeated Al-Qadsia 2–0 to claim their third AFC Cup title in five years, and became the first team to win the AFC Cup three times. Both finalists also qualified for the 2014 AFC Champions League.

Venue
The Al-Sadaqua Walsalam Stadium, also known as the Peace and Friendship Stadium, is located at Kuwait City and holds 21,500 people.

This was the third AFC Cup final held in Kuwait. The 2009 AFC Cup Final was hosted by Al-Kuwait at the Al Kuwait Sports Club Stadium, while the 2010 AFC Cup Final was hosted by Al-Qadsia at the Jaber Al-Ahmad International Stadium.

Background
Al-Kuwait were the defending champions, and had played in three previous finals, winning twice in 2009 and 2012 and losing in 2011, while Al-Qadsia had lost their only previous final in 2010. In fact, since 2009 when Kuwaiti clubs first entered the AFC Cup, this was the fifth straight single-match finals that featured either Al-Kuwait or Al-Qadsia.

The two teams also met in the round of 16 of the 2011 AFC Cup and 2012 AFC Cup, with Al-Kuwait eliminating Al-Qadsia both times on penalties.

Road to final

Note: In all results below, the score of the finalist is given first.

Rules
The final was played as a single match, with the host team decided by draw. If tied after regulation, extra time and, if necessary, penalty shoot-out were used to decide the winner.

Match

References

External links

Final
AFC Cup finals
International club association football competitions hosted by Kuwait
Kuwait SC matches